MasterChef Junior is a gastronomic TV program first aired on 23 December 2013 on La 1. Three thousand children attended the casting for the first season. The first season consisted of 4 episodes. Since season 2, all of the seasons have had 6 episodes.

It was formerly hosted by Eva González, while Jordi Cruz, Samantha Vallejo-Nágera and Pepe Rodríguez are the chefs and remain on the show.

On 28 February 2018, the program was renewed for a sixth season of 6 episodes to be aired in the period 2018–2019.

First season (2013-2014)

Second season (2014-2015)

Third season (2015-2016)

Fourth season (2016-2017)

Fifth season (2017-2018)

Sixth season (2018-2019)

Seventh season (2019-2020)

Eighth season (2020-2021)

Eighth season (2020-2021)

References

External links
 

MasterChef
2013 Spanish television series debuts
Spanish reality television series
La 1 (Spanish TV channel) original programming
Television series about children